Vila Valqueire is a neighborhood in the West Zone of Rio de Janeiro, Brazil. This neighborhood is located in the borders of North and Western zones, and has a good quality of life with many squares, green places and services.

Neighbourhoods in Rio de Janeiro (city)